E. elegans may refer to:
 Echeveria elegans, a plant species
 Elionurus elegans, a grass species found in Nigeria, Senegal and Burkina Faso
 Eleutherodactylus elegans, a frog species found in Colombia
 Erythroneura elegans, a leafhopper species
 Eryx elegans, a non-venomous snake species found in western Central Asia
 Eudorina elegans, a green alga species
 Eudromia elegans, the elegant crested tinamou or Martineta tinamou, a medium-sized bird species found in southern Chile and Argentina
 Euparyphus elegans, a soldier fly species found in Mexico
 Euphorbia elegans, a plant species

Synonyms 
 Eudictyon elegans, a synonym for Corbitella elegans, a glass sponge species found in Indonesia